The 2019–20 UEFA Futsal Champions League was the 34th edition of Europe's premier club futsal tournament, and the 19th edition organized by UEFA. It was also the second edition since the tournament was rebranded from "UEFA Futsal Cup" to "UEFA Futsal Champions League".

The final tournament, originally scheduled to be played from 24 to 26 April 2020 at the Minsk Arena in Minsk, Belarus, was postponed due to the COVID-19 pandemic in Europe. On 17 June 2020, UEFA announced that the final tournament would be played from 9 to 11 October 2020 at the Palau Blaugrana in Barcelona, Spain behind closed doors.

Barcelona defeated ElPozo in the final to win their third title. Sporting CP were the defending champions, but were eliminated in the elite round.

Association team allocation
The association ranking based on the UEFA futsal national team coefficients is used to determine the number of participating teams for each association:
The top three-ranked associations can enter two teams.
The winners of the 2018–19 UEFA Futsal Champions League qualify automatically, and thus their association can also enter a second team. If they are from the top three-ranked associations, the fourth-ranked association can also enter two teams.
All other associations can enter one team (the winners of their regular top domestic futsal league, or in special circumstances, the runners-up).

For this season, the top four-ranked associations, Spain, Portugal, Russia and Kazakhstan, can enter two teams, as Portugal's entries include the title holders, Sporting CP.

Distribution
Teams are ranked according to their UEFA futsal club coefficients, computed based on results of the last three seasons, to decide on the round they enter, as well as their seeding position in the preliminary round and main round draws.

The following is the access list for this season.

Teams
An equal-record total of 57 teams from 53 of the 55 UEFA associations entered this season's competition (Faroe Islands and Liechtenstein did not enter).

The draws for the preliminary round and main round were held on 4 July 2019, 14:00 CEST (UTC+2), at the UEFA headquarters in Nyon, Switzerland. The mechanism of the draws for each round was as follows:
In the preliminary round, the 34 teams were drawn into nine groups: seven groups of four containing one team from each of the seeding positions 1–4, and two groups of three containing one team from each of the seeding positions 1–3. First, the nine teams which were pre-selected as hosts were drawn from their own designated pot and allocated to their respective group as per their seeding positions. Next, the remaining 25 teams were drawn from their respective pot which were allocated according to their seeding positions.
In the main round Path B, the 16 teams were drawn into four groups of four, containing one team from each of the seeding positions 1–4. First, the four teams which were pre-selected as hosts were drawn from their own designated pot and allocated to their respective group as per their seeding positions. Next, the remaining 12 teams were drawn from their respective pot which were allocated according to their seeding positions (including the nine preliminary round winners, whose identity was not known at the time of the draw, which were allocated to first seeding position 4, then seeding position 3, then seeding position 2).
In the main round Path A, the 16 teams were drawn into four groups of four, containing one team from each of the seeding positions 1–4. First, the four teams which were pre-selected as hosts were drawn from their own designated pot and allocated to their respective group as per their seeding positions. Next, the remaining 12 teams were drawn from their respective pot which were allocated according to their seeding positions. Teams from the same association could be drawn in the same group. Based on the decisions taken by the UEFA Emergency Panel, teams from Russia and Ukraine could not be drawn in the same group.

Legend
TH: Title holders
(H): Preliminary and main round hosts

Format
In the preliminary round, main round, and elite round, each group is played as a round-robin mini-tournament at the pre-selected hosts.

In the final tournament, the four qualified teams play in knockout format (semi-finals, third place match, and final), either at a host selected by UEFA from one of the qualified teams or at a neutral venue.

Tiebreakers
In the preliminary round, main round, and elite round, teams are ranked according to points (3 points for a win, 1 point for a draw, 0 points for a loss), and if tied on points, the following tiebreaking criteria are applied, in the order given, to determine the rankings (Regulations Articles 14.01 and 14.02):
Points in head-to-head matches among tied teams;
Goal difference in head-to-head matches among tied teams;
Goals scored in head-to-head matches among tied teams;
If more than two teams are tied, and after applying all head-to-head criteria above, a subset of teams are still tied, all head-to-head criteria above are reapplied exclusively to this subset of teams;
Goal difference in all group matches;
Goals scored in all group matches;
Penalty shoot-out if only two teams have the same number of points, and they met in the last round of the group and are tied after applying all criteria above (not used if more than two teams have the same number of points, or if their rankings are not relevant for qualification for the next stage);
Disciplinary points (red card = 3 points, yellow card = 1 point, expulsion for two yellow cards in one match = 3 points);
UEFA club coefficient;
Drawing of lots.

Schedule
The schedule of the competition is as follows.

In the preliminary round, main round and elite round, the schedule of each group is as follows, with one rest day between matchdays 2 and 3 for four-team groups, and no rest days for three-team groups (Regulations Articles 19.04, 19.05 and 19.06):

Note: For scheduling, the hosts are considered as Team 1, while the visiting teams are considered as Team 2, Team 3, and Team 4 according to their seeding positions.

Preliminary round
The winners of each group advanced to the main round Path B to join the seven teams which receive byes (another 16 teams receive byes to the main round Path A). The preliminary round was scheduled to be played between 27 August and 1 September 2019.

Times are CEST (UTC+2), as listed by UEFA (local times, if different, are in parentheses).

Group A

Group B

Group C

Group D

Group E

Group F

Group G

Group H

Group I

Main round
The main round was scheduled to be played between 8 and 13 October 2019.

Times are CEST (UTC+2), as listed by UEFA (local times, if different, are in parentheses).

Path A
The top three teams of each group in Path A advanced to the elite round.

Group 1

Group 2

Group 3

Group 4

Path B
The winners of each group in Path B advanced to the elite round.

Group 5

Group 6

Group 7

Group 8

Elite round
The draw for the elite round was held on 18 October 2019, 14:00 CEST (UTC+2), at the UEFA Headquarters in Nyon, Switzerland. The 16 teams were drawn into four groups of four, containing one Path A group winners (seeding position 1), one Path A group runners-up (seeding position 2), and two teams which were either Path A group third-placed teams or Path B group winners (seeding positions 3 or 4). First, the seven teams which were potential hosts were drawn from their own designated pot and allocated to their respective group as per their seeding positions, with the first four teams drawn selected as hosts. Next, the remaining nine teams were drawn from their respective pot which were allocated according to their seeding positions (teams, including potential hosts, which were neither Path A group winners nor runners-up were allocated to first seeding position 4, then seeding position 3). Winners and runners-up from the same Path A group could not be drawn in the same group, but third-placed teams could be drawn in the same group as winners or runners-up from the same Path A group. Teams from the same association could be drawn in the same group. Based on the decisions taken by the UEFA Emergency Panel, teams from Russia and Ukraine could not be drawn in the same group.

Legend
(H): Elite round hosts selected by draw
(h): Potential elite round hosts not selected by draw

The winners of each group advanced to the final tournament. The elite round was scheduled to be played between 19 and 24 November 2019.

Times are CET (UTC+1), as listed by UEFA (local times, if different, are in parentheses).

Group A

Group B

Group C

Group D

Final tournament
The final tournament, originally scheduled to be played on 24 and 26 April 2020 at the Minsk Arena, Minsk, was postponed due to concerns over the COVID-19 pandemic in Europe. It was rescheduled to be played on 9 and 11 October 2020 at the Palau Blaugrana, Barcelona.

Venue
The original hosts venue of the final tournament was selected at the UEFA Executive Committee meeting in Nyon, Switzerland on 4 December 2019, with the Minsk Arena in Minsk, Belarus appointed. This would have been the first time that the final tournament would be held at a neutral venue instead of in the country of one of the four qualified teams.

On 17 June 2020, the UEFA Executive Committee chose to relocate the 2020 finals to Palau Blaugrana, Barcelona, Spain due to the COVID-19 pandemic in Europe, and Minsk were instead chosen to host the finals of the 2020–21 UEFA Futsal Champions League in April 2021.

Qualified teams
The following four teams qualified for the final tournament.

In the following table, final tournaments until 2018 were in the Futsal Cup era, since 2019 were in the UEFA Futsal Champions League era. Only final tournaments in four-team format starting from 2007 are shown.

Final draw
The draw for the final tournament was held on 5 February 2020, 19:00 FET (UTC+3), by Aleksandr Hleb at the Belarus Olympic Committee headquarters in Minsk. The four teams were drawn into two semi-finals without any restrictions.

Bracket
In the semi-finals and final, extra time and penalty shoot-out are used to decide the winner if necessary; however, no extra time is used in the third place match (Regulations Article 17.01 and 17.02).

Times are CEST (UTC+2), as listed by UEFA.

Semi-finals

Third place match

Final

Top goalscorers
Preliminary round: 
Main round: 
Elite round: 
Final tournament:

References

External links

UEFA Futsal Champions League Matches: 2019–20, UEFA.com

2019-20
Champions League
August 2019 sports events in Europe
October 2019 sports events in Europe
November 2019 sports events in Europe
October 2020 sports events in Europe
Sports events postponed due to the COVID-19 pandemic